Starobaskakovo (İśke Baśqaq) is a rural locality (a village) in Matveyevsky Selsoviet, Kushnarenkovsky District, Bashkortostan, Russia. The population was 301 as of 2010. There are 8 streets.

Geography 
Starobaskakovo is located 8 km northwest of Kushnarenkovo (the district's administrative centre) by road. Kushnarenkovo is the nearest rural locality.

References 

Rural localities in Kushnarenkovsky District